This is a list of Billboard magazine's Top Hot 100 songs of 1984.

See also
1984 in music
List of Billboard Hot 100 number ones of 1984
List of Billboard Hot 100 top-ten singles in 1984

References

1984 record charts
Billboard charts